Arvi Aavik (born 31 December 1969, Viljandi) is an Estonian former wrestler who competed in the 1992 Summer Olympics and in the 1996 Summer Olympics.

References

External links
 

1969 births
Living people
Olympic wrestlers of Estonia
Wrestlers at the 1992 Summer Olympics
Wrestlers at the 1996 Summer Olympics
Estonian male sport wrestlers
Sportspeople from Viljandi